Maratón La Guadalupe de Ponce (English: La Guadalupe Ponce Marathon" or, sometimes, "Ponce Marathon"), is a long-distance running event held every year in Ponce, Puerto Rico. Established in 1970, it is the only Olympic marathon held in Puerto Rico.

It starts at 5AM, and runs from the intersection of PR-12 and PR-14 to Parque de Bombas. It is managed by Secretaría de Recreación y Deportes (Secretariat of Recreation and Sports) of the municipality of Ponce.

The 40th edition of the marathon in 2010 was attended by over 10,000 people. Some 150 athletes participate in the event each year. In 2010, the event received an award from the Federación de Atletismo de Puerto Rico (Puerto Rico Athletic Federation) as the best athletic running event in Puerto Rico; it had attained a perfect 100-point score in all evaluation areas.

Overview
In addition to being the only one of the international marathons run over the distance of 42.195 kilometers and the national marathon of Puerto Rico, the marathon is the qualifying race for the Central American and Caribbean Games.

In addition to medals, Marathon organizers award cash prizes to winners, in both men and women categories, exceeding USD$30K. First place winners receive a $2,000 cash prize. The next five follow-up winners receive $1,000, $500, $400, $200 and $80 respectively. The Marathon also awards prizes to winners, both men and women, in these nine age categories: 20–24, 25–29, 30–34, 35–39, 40–44, 45–49, 50–54, 55–59 and 60+. First, second and third-place winners in each of these categories receive $80, $50 and $25 prizes, respectively. Unlike other marathons, registration for La Guadalupe is free; registration generally takes place the day before the event (Saturday) at Parque de Bombas. The $2,000 cash prize is the highest cash prize paid out for any running event in Puerto Rico.

Route
The race starts at 5:00 am at PR-12 (Avenida Santiago de los Caballeros) at the intersection with PR-14 (Avenida Tito Castro/Avenida Betances) and heads south towards La Guancha. It makes 3 round trips on Avenida Santiago de los Caballeros and, on the fourth round, it then detours onto Avenida Las Americas (PR-163) heading west towards PR-123 (Avenida Hostos). At Avenida Hostos it turns right onto Calle Marina and heads north towards Plaza Las Delicias. The finish line will be at Calle Marina intersection with Calle Cristina, that is, right in front of Parque de Bombas in downtown Ponce. The race coincides with the Fiestas patronales de Ponce celebration. The 50th edition (2021) introduced a new route.

Results

1982 (12th edition)

1983 (13th edition)
The event took place on 11 December.

1985 (15th edition)

1986 (16th edition)

1988 (18th edition)

1991 (21st edition)

1992 (22nd edition)

1993 (23rd edition)
The event was cancelled due to scheduling conflict with the concurrent event of the Puerto Rico 1993 Central American and Caribbean Games celebrated this year in Ponce.

1994 (24th edition)

2002 (32nd edition)

2003 (33rd edition)

2004 (34th edition)

2006 (36th edition)
The event took place on 10 December.

2007 (37th edition)
Prior to this year the marathon was essentially a men's-only event. Women could run it but they were not awarded prizes. Starting with the 2007 marathon, women runners were officially registered as competing runners and awarded prizes the same as men.

2008 (38th edition)
The event took place on 14 December.

2009 (39th edition)
The event, which ordinarily takes place on a Sunday, this year took place on a Saturday (12 December). The goal was to have it coincide with Las Mañanitas to maximize the attendance to the Marathon. This year there was also a change to the route of the event.

2010 (40th edition)
The event took place on 12 December.

2011 (41st edition)
The event took place on Sunday 11 December.

2012 (42nd edition)
The event took place on 9 December.

2013 (43rd edition)
The event took place on Sunday 8 December.

2015 (45rd edition)
The event took place on Sunday 8 December.

2017 (47th edition)
The event was cancelled due to the 20 September Hurricane Maria. The event had been scheduled for 10 December 2017.

2018 (48th edition)
The event took place on Sunday 9 December.

5K Run

2019 (49th edition)
The event took place on Sunday 15 December.

5K Run

2020 (Cancelled)
The event was cancelled due to the 20 COVID-19 pandemic in Puerto Rico.

2021 (50th edition)
The event took place on Sunday, 12 December. Beverly Ramos Morales set a new record in the women's division.

Notes

Footnotes

References

External links
 A personal reflection of a 2015 Ponce Maratón de la Guadalupe runner/winner
 10 Characteristics of Running Events in Puerto Rico
 2018 Maraton De La Guadalupe
 Mia Lind-Correa's personal reflection at Maraton De La Guadalupe

Recurring sporting events established in 1970
1970 establishments in Puerto Rico
December sporting events
Sports in Ponce, Puerto Rico
Sports events in Ponce, Puerto Rico
Athletics in Puerto Rico
Annual events in Puerto Rico
Entertainment events in Puerto Rico